Alain Grée (born 21 July 1936 in Eaubonne, France) is a French illustrator and author.

Education
Grée studied in Paris at the Ecole des Arts appliqués (atelier d'Art Graphique) and at the Beaux-Arts de Paris.

Career
Grée wrote three detective novels ("La Chouette" editions) and produced children's broadcasts on the French national television for two years.
 
As an author and illustrator of children's books, Alain Grée published over 300 works for several publishers, including Casterman and Hachette, most of them in the 1960s and 1970s. His books were translated into 25 different languages. In that same period, Alain Grée also invented illustrated artwork for 12 educational board games for children, issued by Nathan. 
 
Grée also worked as an illustrator for Pomme d'Api and Journal de Babar magazines. He later created 10 books as initiation works to ship navigation for Gallimard editions.

He worked as a journalist for the Voiles et Voiliers sailing ships magazine for 20 years, and is currently working as a graphic designer and editor of advertising publications.

Personal life
Grée married Monique in 1960 at Balbigny, and they have two children.

His main hobby and passion is sailing, and he has owned several sailboats. In the 1970s, he sailed across the Atlantic Ocean twice.

Major books 
Hachette 
 Il y a ... series (1966–1967)
 J'apprends ... series (1968–1975)
 Qu'est-ce qui ... series (1966–1976)
 les racontes series (1969–1971)
 je serai series (1972–1973)

Casterman 
 Achille et Bergamote series (1962–1983)
 CADET-RAMA series (1962–1983)
 ROMEO series (1966–1968)

Other publishers 
 FERNAND NATHAN EDITIONS (1959–1962)
 FLEURUS EDITIONS (1963–1964)
 GAUTIER-LANGUEREAU EDITIONS (1963–1964)
 FARANDOLE EDITIONS (1963)
 ARMAND COLIN EDITIONS (1966–1967)

References

External links
 Alain Gree Official Site

French children's writers
French illustrators
1936 births
Living people
École des Beaux-Arts alumni
People from Val-d'Oise
French male writers